Parupeneus spilurus, the blackspot goatfish, is a species of goatfish native to the western Pacific ocean, from Japan to Australia and New Zealand. This species can reach a length of  TL. It is a commercially important species.

References

Black-spot goatfish
Fish described in 1854